Heterostegane is a genus of moths in the family Geometridae described by George Hampson in 1893.

Species
 Heterostegane amputata Herbulot, 1993
 Heterostegane auranticollis Prout, 1922
 Heterostegane aurantiaca Warren, 1894
 Heterostegane bifasciata (Warren, 1914)
 Heterostegane boghensis Wiltshire, 1985
 Heterostegane circumrubrata Prout, 1915
 Heterostegane constessellata (Prout, 1926)
 Heterostegane elephantina Herbulot, 1992
 Heterostegane felix (Herbulot, 1974)
 Heterostegane flavata (Warren, 1905)
 Heterostegane hyriaria Warren, 1894
 Heterostegane incognita Prout, 1915
 Heterostegane infusca (Herbulot, 1973)
 Heterostegane insulata Warren, 1898
 Heterostegane leroyi (D. S. Fletcher, 1958)
 Heterostegane luteorubens (Mabille, 1900)
 Heterostegane maxima (Herbulot, 1957)
 Heterostegane mediosecta Herbulot, 1993
 Heterostegane minax Prout 1931
 Heterostegane minuscula Herbulot, 1995
 Heterostegane minutissima (Swinhoe, 1904)
 Heterostegane monilifera Prout, 1915
 Heterostegane nyassa Herbulot, 1993
 Heterostegane pachyspila (D. S. Fletcher, 1958)
 Heterostegane pleninotata (Warren, 1901)
 Heterostegane rectifascia Hampson
 Heterostegane robinsoni (Herbulot, 1957)
 Heterostegane ruberata (Mabille, 1900)
 Heterostegane serrata (D. S. Fletcher, 1958)
 Heterostegane subfasciata Warren, 1899
 Heterostegane subtessellata (Walker, [1863])
 Heterostegane thieli Herbulot, 1995
 Heterostegane tritocampsis (Prout, 1934)
 Heterostegane urbica (Swinhoe, 1895)
 Heterostegane vetula Prout, 1916
 Heterostegane warreni (Prout, 1932)

References

Abraxini